Doom 3: BFG Edition is a remastered version of Doom 3, released worldwide in October 2012 for Microsoft Windows, PlayStation 3, and Xbox 360. The BFG Edition features enhanced graphics, better audio (with more horror effects), a checkpoint save system, and support for 3D displays and head-mounted displays (HMD). The game also includes the previous expansion, Resurrection of Evil, and a new single-player expansion pack called The Lost Mission. Additionally, it includes copies of the original Doom (the Ultimate Doom edition with the add-on fourth episode, "Thy Flesh Consumed"), and Doom II with the expansion No Rest for the Living, previously available for the Xbox 360. The BFG Edition also features the ability to use the flashlight while holding a weapon, in the form of the armor-mounted flashlight.

The source code of Doom 3: BFG Editions game engine was released under the GNU GPL-3.0-or-later on the 26th of November 2012.

On July 26, 2019, Doom 3: BFG Edition was released as Doom 3 for PlayStation 4, Xbox One, and Nintendo Switch.

Plot

Doom 3

Resurrection of Evil

The Lost Mission
The player takes the role of the last surviving member of Bravo team, which was seen being ambushed by demons in Doom 3. The Bravo team survivor is contacted by Dr. Richard Meyers (voiced by Paul Eiding), a scientist working on teleportation experiments in Exis Labs, and asked to help Meyers destroy an experimental teleportation array that was captured by the demons and is currently held deep inside Hell. The array is potentially powerful enough to send an army of demons all the way to Earth, hence Meyers' desperation to destroy it. To achieve this goal, the marine must acquire the components necessary to activate the Exis Labs teleportation system, then travel to Hell in order to destroy the teleportation array. In the epilogue, the marine is teleported by Dr. Meyers back to Mars.  The reinforcements from Earth arrive to search for another marine who is still missing; eventually, they find him in the Delta Labs complex.

Reception

The game received mixed reviews. The updated graphics, sound design, and inclusion of the new Lost Mission content were praised. Criticism was directed at the BFG Editionss long load times, forced auto-saves, and control scheme which forces the player to cycle through their weapons continuously in order to access a particular weapon – a feature deemed extremely inappropriate given the game's suspenseful, action-oriented gameplay. The controls overall were considered a step backwards due to the previous generation ports of Doom 3 allowing players to assign weapons to hotkeys. The inability to toggle back to the traditional flashlight mechanic of the original game was also criticized.

Notes

References

External links

 Official website

2012 video games
Android (operating system) games
Bethesda Softworks games
Commercial video games with freely available source code
Cooperative video games
Doom (franchise) games
First-person shooters
Id Software games
Id Tech games
Multiplayer and single-player video games
Multiplayer online games
Nintendo Switch games
PlayStation 3 games
PlayStation 4 games
Science fantasy video games
Video games about demons
Video game compilations
Video games developed in the United States
Video games set in the 22nd century
Video games set on Mars
Windows games
Xbox 360 games
Xbox One games
Horror video games